The 38th Annual César Awards ceremony, presented by the French Academy of Cinema Arts and Techniques (Académie des Arts et Techniques du Cinéma), was held on 22 February 2013, at the Théâtre du Châtelet in Paris. The ceremony was chaired by Jamel Debbouze, with Antoine de Caunes as master of ceremonies. Nominations were announced 25 January 2013. Michael Haneke's film Amour, nominated in ten categories, won in five, including Best Film, Best Director, Best Actor and Best Actress.

Winners and nominees
Winners are listed first and highlighted in bold.

Honorary César 
Kevin Costner, American actor, director and producer

Viewers
The show was followed by 2.5 million viewers. This corresponds to 12.5% of the audience.

See also
 85th Academy Awards
 66th British Academy Film Awards
 25th European Film Awards
 18th Lumières Awards
 3rd Magritte Awards

References

External links
 Official website
 
 38th César Awards at AlloCiné

2013
2013 in French cinema
2013 film awards